Cannon Building can refer to:
 Cannon Building (Troy, New York), listed on the National Register of Historic Places (NRHP) in Rensselaer County, New York
 Cannon Building (Fountain Inn, South Carolina), listed on the NRHP in South Carolina
 Cannon House Office Building of the United States House of Representatives.